The Americas Zone is one of three zones of regional Davis Cup competition in 2009.

Group I

Group II

Group III

Pool A

Pool B

Promotion Pool

Relegation Pool

 and  promoted to Group II in 2010.
 and  relegated to Group IV in 2010.

Group IV

  &  advanced to Group III in 2010.

See also

External links
Davis Cup draw details

 
Americas Zone